Star Trek: Attack Wing is a multiplayer tabletop game set within the Star Trek "universe". It is produced by WizKids and was first released to retail in August, 2013.

Players assume the roles of commanders who can customize, upgrade, and assign famous crew members to their fleets from the Dominion, Federation, Klingon, and Romulan factions. Fleets have their special statistics, abilities, and unique maneuvers displayed on cards that cover the ships along with upgrades such as crew, weapons and technology. The game utilizes the "FlightPath maneuver system" for its gaming mechanics, under license from Fantasy Flight Games.

Additional gaming scenarios from the Dominion Wars will be playable on space maps distributed through an Organized Play Program.

The game's painted ship molds are identical to those utilized in the Star Trek: Tactics games, although the Federation faction ships in Attack Wing do not have names or registries painted onto their hulls. Unpainted versions of some of the ship molds were also previously released in the Star Trek: Fleet Captains game.

A unique promotional Khan Singh Captain card was released exclusively at the Gen Con gaming convention in August 2013.

Core game sets
The core sets, which is required to play the game, includes rules, Quick Start rules, Ship, Captain, Crew and Upgrade cards, Range ruler, manoeuvre rulers, game tokens, and pre painted plastic ships.

Original: starter set ships

Federation vs. Klingons: starter set ships

Alliance - Dominion War: starter set ships

Star Trek: Attack Wing – expansions
Expansion packs include cards, a movement dial, tokens and are sold individually in transparent plastic packaging.

Ship packs

Card packs
Expansion card packs include cards and tokens and are sold individually in transparent plastic packaging with a cardboard backing.

Faction packs
Faction Packs resemble the well-known Starter Set in packaging but focus on one Faction within Star Trek: Attack Wing.

Organized play events

The Dominion War storyline

Retailers will host game tournaments for players who will compete for dominance of the Alpha Quadrant in a series of Dominion War Storyline OP Events. Each month, players will collect participation prizes and vie for a unique ship.

The player who has the best overall record will be crowned Fleet Admiral and awarded a "Special Grand Prize" Deep Space 9 model at the conclusion of the six monthly events.

Other storylines

The Collective

Resistance is Futile

Q-Continuum

Temporal Cold War

Classic Movies

Klingon Civil War

References

External links
 Starter Set Website
 New Starter Set Website
 How to play Star Trek Attack Wing Video from Wizkids at Origins 2013 
 Rules PDF
 Revised Rules 9.14.17 PDF
 Quick-Start Rules PDF
 Breakdown
 FAQ
 

Board games introduced in 2013
Attack Wing
Miniatures games
Science fiction board wargames